Heniot Lévy (19 July 1879, in Warsaw – 16 June 1945) was an American composer, teacher, and pianist of Polish birth. A native of Warsaw, he trained at the Hochschule für Musik in Berlin with Oscar Raif and Karl Heinrich Barth, both pupils of Tausig; the latter also trained Arthur Rubinstein.   Lévy made his debut touring with the Berlin Philharmonic in 1898. He came to the United States in 1905, settling in Chicago, Illinois. Lévy taught at the American Conservatory of Music;  he toured and performed with the orchestras of Chicago and Minneapolis. As a composer he wrote mainly chamber music, and he recorded a handful of piano rolls, including some of his own work.

Levy died in 1945. He was the maternal grandfather of Igor Kipnis.

See also
 for a list of biographical references (gives 1946 for year of death.)

References
General references

 Baker's Biographical Dictionary of Musicians, Sixth edition, revised by Nicolas Slonimsky, Collier Macmillan Publishers, London
 Baker's Biographical Dictionary of Musicians, Seventh edition, revised by Nicolas Slonimsky, New York: Macmillan Publishing Co., Schirmer Books, 1984
 Baker's Biographical Dictionary of Musicians, Eighth edition, revised by Nicolas Slonimsky, Macmillan Publishing Co., New York (1992)
 Baker's Biographical Dictionary of Musicians, Ninth edition, edited by Laura Kuhn, Schirmer Books, New York (2001)
 Baker's Biographical Dictionary of Twentieth-Century Classical Musicians, by Nicolas Slonimsky, Schirmer Books, New York (1997)
 Biography Index. A cumulative index to biographical material in books and magazines, Volume 2: August 1949 – August 1952, H.W. Wilson Co., New York (1953)
 Contemporary American Composers, A biographical dictionary, First edition, compiled by E. Ruth Anderson, G.K. Hall & Co., Boston (1976)
 Contemporary American Composers, A biographical dictionary, Second edition, compiled by E. Ruth Anderson, G.K. Hall & Co., Boston (1982)

External links 

 Heniot Lévy papers at The Newberry

Inline citations

1879 births
1945 deaths
American composers
American male composers
American pianists
American male pianists
American Conservatory of Music faculty
Polish emigrants to the United States